The 1962–63 Football League Cup was the third season of the Football League Cup, a knockout competition for England's top 92 football clubs; only 80 of them took part. The competition began on 3 September 1962, and ended with the two-legged final on 23 and 27 May 1963.

The tournament was won by Birmingham City, who beat near-neighbours Aston Villa 3–1 on aggregate. Birmingham won the first leg 3–1 at their home ground St Andrew's, thanks to goals from Jimmy Bloomfield and Ken Leek (2), with Bobby Thomson scoring Villa's goal. The second leg at Villa Park ended in a 0–0 draw and Birmingham won 3–1 on aggregate..

Match dates and results were initially drawn from Soccerbase, and they were later checked against Rothmans Football Yearbook 1970–71.

Calendar
Of the 80 teams, 48 received a bye to the second round and the other 32 played in the first round; these were the teams ranked 61st to 91st in the 1961–62 Football League, plus Oxford United, who had entered the Football League as replacements for Accrington Stanley. Semi-finals and final were played over two legs.

First round

Ties

Replays

Second round

Ties

Replays

2nd Replays

Third round

Ties

Replays

Fourth round

Ties

Replay

Fifth round

Ties

Semi-finals

First leg

Second leg

Final

The final was played over two legs. The first leg was held at St Andrew's, Birmingham on 23 May 1963 and the second leg was held at Villa Park, Birmingham, on 27 May 1963.

Birmingham City won 3–1 on aggregate.

References

General

Specific
									
									
									
									

1962–63
1962–63 domestic association football cups
Lea
Cup